Bank of Ceylon - Malé Branch
Bank of Maldives
Commercial Bank of Maldives
Maldives Islamic Bank
The Mauritius Commercial Bank (Maldives) Private Limited
The Hongkong and Shanghai Banking Corporation
State Bank of India
Habib Bank Limited

References 

Maldives
Banks
Maldives